Nevada's 15th Senate district is one of 21 districts in the Nevada Senate. It has  been represented by Republican Heidi Gansert since 2016, succeeding fellow Republican Jesse Haw, who filled in the seat after Greg Brower's resignation.

Geography
District 15 is based in southwestern Washoe County, taking in parts of Reno and its surrounding suburbs, including Cold Springs, Mogul, and Verdi.

The district is located entirely within Nevada's 2nd congressional district, and overlaps with the 25th and 27th districts of the Nevada Assembly. It borders the state of California.

Recent election results
Nevada Senators are elected to staggered four-year terms; since 2012 redistricting, the 15th district has held elections in presidential years.

2020

2016

2012

Federal and statewide results in District 15

References 

15
Washoe County, Nevada